James Nyang Chiengjiek (born March 2, 1992) is a runner originally from South Sudan, but now living and training in Kenya. He was selected by the International Olympic Committee (IOC) to compete for the Refugee Olympic Team (ROT) at the 2016 Summer Olympics. He placed last in his 400 m heat. He was also qualified to the 2020 Tokyo Olympics ROT, and placed last in his 800 m heat after tripping due to a fellow competitor's involuntary touch.

Personal life
Chiengjiek is originally from Bentiu, South Sudan. In 1999 his father, who was a soldier, was killed during the Second Sudanese Civil War. At the age of 13 Chiengjiek left South Sudan and escaped to Kenya as a refugee to avoid being recruited by rebels as a child soldier. In 2002 he ended up at the Kakuma refugee camp. The United Nations High Commissioner for Refugees (UNHCR) officially granted him refugee status in December 2014.

Athletics career
He began running whilst attending school in Kenya; joining a group of older children from a town in the highlands known for its long-distance runners who were training for events. He often had to train without shoes which resulted in him getting injured frequently.

In 2013 he was selected to join a group of athletes in the Tegla Loroupe Peace Foundation, a support program for refugees from the Kakuma camp run by former marathon world record holder Tegla Loroupe. These athletes were identified by the IOC as having the potential to compete at the 2016 Summer Olympics.

On 3 June 2016 the IOC announced that Chiengjiek would be part of a team of ten athletes selected to compete for the Refugee Olympic Team at the 2016 Summer Olympics in Rio de Janeiro, Brazil.

Chiengjiek qualified for the IOC Refugee Olympic Team at the 2020 Summer Olympics in Tokyo and competed in the 800m, placing last after being touched and falling.

Competitions

References

External links

 Article about Chiengjiek

1992 births
Living people
South Sudanese male sprinters
South Sudanese refugees
Athletes (track and field) at the 2016 Summer Olympics
Athletes (track and field) at the 2020 Summer Olympics
People from Unity (state)
Refugee Olympic Team at the 2016 Summer Olympics
Refugee Olympic Team at the 2020 Summer Olympics
South Sudanese expatriate sportspeople in Kenya
Refugees in Kenya